Fantasia Lindum was an album released by the band Amazing Blondel in 1971. It featured the style of music which they described as "pseudo-Elizabethan/Classical acoustic music sung with British accents".
The album title is taken from the musical sequence which makes up the first side of the album: a fantasia is a free musical composition with its roots in the art of improvisation; Lindum is the Latin name for the city of Lincoln.

The dog which appears on the album cover was Terry Wincott's great dane, called Jacob.

The music
The music throughout the album features Amazing Blondel's unique blend of their own compositions with folk themes and renaissance music. The album's cover art (credited to Visualeyes) suggests a historical setting around the Civil War period, but the music has more of the vitality of the Elizabethan period. A variety of instruments were used, but the central sound is of the two lutes, played by Gladwin and Baird, with wind instruments played by Wincott.

The "Fantasia Lindum" sequence, which makes up the first side of the album, is the band's musical tribute to the city of Lincoln, the Lincolnshire countryside and the mediaeval Lincoln Cathedral. It is an ambitious suite of songs and instrumental pieces featuring recurring musical themes.

The second side includes two madrigal-like songs ("To Ye" and "Three Seasons Almaine") and two instrumental dance tunes. There is a hymn-like song ("Safety In God Alone"), which sounds much more based in the twentieth-century than the remainder of the album, having a harmonic structure more like that developed by bands such as the Eagles. The album concludes with the brash "Siege of Yaddlethorpe", a "pipe and drum" instrumental piece featuring Wincott's (presumably multi-tracked) crumhorns and a guest appearance of Jim Capaldi playing (again presumably multi-tracked) military-style snare drums.

Track listing

Musicians
John David Gladwin - second lute, lead vocals, double bass, theorbo
Terence Alan Wincott - recorders, vocals, piano, crumhorn, harpsichord, harmonium, other woodwind
Edward Baird - first lute, vocals, glockenspiel, dulcimer, guitar
Jim Capaldi - drums on "Siege of Yaddlethorpe"

Release history
 Fantasia Lindum, Island Records ILPS-9156, 12" LP, 1971
 Fantasia Lindum, Edsel Records 459, CD, 1996
 Evensong/Fantasia Lindum, Beat Goes On 626, CD, 2004

Amazing Blondel albums
1971 albums
Island Records albums
Albums produced by Paul Samwell-Smith